Gabriela Hill is a Mexican-American television personality who hosted Poker After Dark on Discovery Channel in Spanish-speaking Latin America from April through October 2010, on People+Arts Latin America from January through April 2010, on Azteca 7 and on Proyecto 40 in Mexico from May through December 2009.  She was the Spanish-language voice of poker and the World Series of Poker (WSOP) on ESPN Latin America and ESPN Deportes from July 2004 through March 2009.

Biography
Gabriela was born in Mexico City.  She attended Universidad Iberoamericana, where she earned her undergraduate degree in Industrial Psychology.

Gabriela has 25 years of television broadcasting experience, starting in Mexico City as host of children's programs at Imevision (the present day Azteca Uno).  She then spent 8 years as a local news anchor and reporter at Telemundo Dallas-Fort Worth and Univision Houston before switching to sports television by joining Prime Deportiva (the present day Fox Deportes) in 1995.

Gabriela became the first female Spanish-language sports television reporter in the U.S. when she was hired by Univision Deportes in 1996.  At Univision, Gabriela was the sideline reporter for Major League Soccer (MLS) live telecasts and she was part of the Univision news team that won the prestigious Edward R. Murrow Award for Best Newscast in 1997.  Gabriela traveled more than 200,000 miles over two years to cover a different sports event each week, including the NFL Super Bowl, the Major League Baseball and National Basketball Association Playoffs and All-Star Games, and championship boxing matches.  She has interviewed sports stars such as Michael Jordan, Cal Ripken Jr. and Brett Favre.

In 2000, Gabriela joined start-up PanAmerican Sports Network (PSN), where she enjoyed some of the most productive years of her television career.  Gabriela had the opportunity to broadcast more than 300 sports programs including live coverage of the Sydney 2000 Olympic Games and the 2000 CONCACAF Women's Gold Cup soccer tournament.

Gabriela moved on to ESPN in Bristol, Connecticut just prior to the launch of ESPN Deportes as a 24-hour Spanish-language TV network serving the U.S. Hispanic market in February 2004.  When Gabriela's boss asked her if she wanted to announce poker in Spanish for audiences in Mexico and Latin America, Gabriela jumped right in.  Since then, she had become known as the voice of the World Series of Poker in Latin America and her voice was heard in over 20 countries from Mexico to Argentina as well as the U.S. Besides calling every WSOP Main Event Final Table from 2004 to 2008, Gabriela voiced over 300 hours of poker television.

Starting in May 2007, Gabriela wrote poker columns and appeared on camera to deliver Consejos del póquer con Gabriela Hill (Poker Advice with Gabriela Hill) video vignettes for ESPNdeportes.com.

Shortly after leaving ESPN in April 2009, Gabriela was offered one of her dream poker television assignments as host of Poker After Dark.

References

Poker commentators
Mexican poker players
Mexican people of English descent
Mexican emigrants to the United States
Living people
Year of birth missing (living people)